Petre Miclăuș (born 10 July 1939) is a Romanian gymnast. He competed in eight events at the 1964 Summer Olympics.

References

External links
 

1939 births
Living people
Sportspeople from Satu Mare
Romanian male artistic gymnasts
Olympic gymnasts of Romania
Gymnasts at the 1964 Summer Olympics